Malvino Ramos Salvador (born January 31, 1976) is a Brazilian actor and model.

Biography 

Malvino was born in Manaus, Amazonas, where he lived until he was 25 years old. He is of Portuguese descent. In Manaus, he was a bank clerk and studied accounting sciences at the Federal University of Amazonas. After participating in parades, for fun, Malvino was invited to move from Manaus to São Paulo, where he worked as a model in advertising campaigns and invest in his acting career. Malvino was acted by Carlos Alexandre Oliveira Correa, who integrated him in the casting of the agency of models Duomo, going next to the agencies BRM Models and L'equipe.

Career 
His first role in a Novela (Latin American Soap Opera), Cabocla he played Tobias, one of the main antagonists. Soon after Cabocla, Malvino starred Alma Gêmea, the role of chef Vitório. In O Profeta, the actor again played one of the main antagonists, Camilo who ended up being murdered and his death was a major mystery in the plot. In the novela Sete Pecados he played Regis, a character who was always running away from marriage and commitment. His first protagonist was Gabriel in Caras & Bocas.

In 2011 starred in Fina Estampa, as a protagonist of the children of Griselda. Quinzé was the brother of Antenor and Amalia, played by Sophie Charlotte. Malvino stars as Bruno in the 2013 Rede Globo telenovela Amor à Vida.

Personal life
Malvino is the father of a girl named Sofia, born in Brasilia, on June 19, 2009. The child is the result of a relationship with Ana Ceolin.

He also has two daughters and one son with famed jiu-jitsu fighter Kyra Gracie.

Filmography

Television

Film

Theater

Awards & Nominations

References

External links

 

1976 births
Living people
Male actors from Manaus
Brazilian people of Portuguese descent
Brazilian male television actors
Brazilian male film actors
Brazilian male models
Brazilian male stage actors
Federal University of Amazonas alumni